Raja is the third studio album by Finnish thrash metal band Stam1na. It was released on 15 February 2008.

Track listing
 "Hammasratas" (4:08) "Cogwheel"
 "Susi-Ihminen" (3:57) "Wolf-Human"
 "Muistipalapelit" (5:34) "Memory Jigsaw Puzzle"
 "Vartijaton" (5:12) "Guardless"
 "Voima Vastaan Viha" (3:36) "Strength Against Hatred"
 "Lääke" (4:24) "Medicine"
 "Kädet Vasten Lasia" (4:02) "Hands Against the Glass"
 "Luova Hulluus" (3:57) "Creative Madness"
 "Muuri" (4:24) "The Wall"
 "Murtumispiste" (4:28) "Breaking Point"

Personnel
 Antti Hyyrynen – vocals, backing vocals, guitar
 Kai-Pekka Kangasmäki – bass, backing vocals
 Pekka Olkkonen – lead guitar
 Teppo Velin – drums

Additional musicians
 Jyri Kangastalo – backing vocals
 Emil Lähteenmäki – keyboards
 Sonja Nurmela – backing vocals on tracks 1 and 5
 Tuomo Saikkonen – additional vocals on track 6, backing vocals
 Tommy Huovinen – additional vocals on track 2, backing vocals

Technical 
 Janne Joutsenniemi – producer, engineer
 Miitri Aaltonen – mixing
 Mika Jussila – mastering
 Ville Hyyrynen – cover, graphics
 Jouni Kallio, Marianne Heikkilä, Nina Palin – photography
 Jarkko Martikainen – assistant lyricist

External links 
 Official Stam1na website

2008 albums
Stam1na albums